Mistry, or Mistri, is a surname found in India or amongst people of Indian origin. Gujarat, Rajasthan, Uttar Pradesh, Bihar and even West Bengal.And Bangladesh.This surname is used by Vishwakarma communities of India. It is an occupation surname.

Meaning

The word Mistri or Mistry in Maharashtra & Gujarat is identified with people who are experts in architecture, sound in Mechanical, Technical subjects or experts in Building Constructions MistriBabu. Mistry also means carpenter.

By Suthar Community
The Mistri or Mistry is used as a surname by the Vishwakarma Suthar community of Maharashtra, Gujarat, Karachi and Rajasthan. It is a common surname found among them.

By Parsi Community

Mistri or Mistry is also a common surname in the Parsi community of India. Again, this is a surname adopted by them due to a professional reason, as said earlier, the word Mistri or Mistry in Gujarati language is identified with people involved in building construction. And the Parsi community is known to have their roots in Gujarat.

By Muslim Kadia

Mistry or Mistri is also a surname found among Muslim Kadia community living in Kutch and Saurashtra region of Gujarat. Many of them even today use the surname Mistry, which was actually their community or professional identity before they converted to Islam. Many members of their community using Mistry as surname can be found living today in Zanzibar, Tanzania, Kenya, Uganda, Muscat, Maldives, etc., where they have migrated more than a century ago.

People with the surname

Bina Mistry, UK Bhangra singer
Cyrus Pallonji Mistry (1968–2022), former CMD of Tata Sons
Cyrus Danaei Mistry, Indian writer
Dharmica Mistry, Australian scientist and entrepreneur
Dhruva Mistry, sculptor
 Fali Mistry (1919-1979), Indian cinematographer and director
 Jal Mistry (1923-2000), Indian cinematographer, four time Filmfare Award winner
Jimi Mistry, UK actor
Madhusudan Mistry, Indian politician
Nita Mistry, character in EastEnders
Pallonji Mistry (1929–2022), Indian entrepreneur
Pranav Mistry, Inventor of Sixthsense device and Global Vice President of Research at Samsung Electronics.
Rohinton Mistry, Indian-born Canadian writer
Shaheen Mistry, Founder, Teach for India
"Amit Mistry, (1974-2021) Indian Actor

See also

Mistri
Mistri (caste)
Mistris of Kutch

References

Surnames of Indian origin
Indian surnames
Gujarati-language surnames